Sweet & Lowdown is an album by folk musician and singer Dave Van Ronk, released in 2001. It was the last studio album released in his lifetime. In this album, Van Ronk returns to recording pop and jazz standards.

Reception

Writing for Allmusic, critic Travis Dageset wrote of the album "The tunes swing along with Van Ronk's mildly Louis Armstrong-flavored rasp, which holds up throughout... for the most part, this is indispensable Van Ronk, whose forte, apart from his gift for songwriting, has always been classic interpretation that contains as much of his own distinct personality as it does respect for whatever form of American music he is delving into."

Track listing
"I'll See You in My Dreams" (Isham Jones, Gus Kahn) – 2:44
"Comes Love" (Brown, Stept, Tobias) – 3:44
"Zoot Suit" (Gilbert, O'Brien) – 3:41
"As Time Goes By" (Herman Hupfeld) – 5:08
"Some of These Days" (Brooks) – 4:00
"Thanks for the Memory" (Ralph Rainger, Leo Robin) – 6:00
"Puttin' on the Ritz" (Irving Berlin) – 2:49
"Blues in the News" (Ingham) – 2:56
"I'd Rather Charleston" (Carter, Gershwin) – 3:18
"I Can't Get Started" (Duke, Gershwin) – 6:29
"Sweet and Low Down" (George Gershwin, Ira Gershwin) – 3:37
"I Wonder Where Our Love Has Gone" (Johnson) – 5:17
"Your Feet's Too Big" (Benson, Fisher) – 3:33
"Bye Bye Blackbird" (Mort Dixon, Ray Henderson) – 4:05
"A Cottage for Sale" (Conley, Robison) – :29

Personnel
Dave Van Ronk – vocals, guitar
 Frank Christian –  guitar
Vince Giordano – banjo, saxophone
Keith Ingham – piano
Jon-Erik Kellso – trumpet
Arnie Kinsella – drums
Sarah Partridge – background vocals
Scott Robinson – clarinet, tenor and alto saxophone
Andrea Vuocolo – background vocals
Murray Wall – double bass

Production notes
Produced by Dave Van Ronk and Keith Ingham
Engineered by Arthur Steuer
Mastered by Renée Marc-Aurèle and Ian Terry
Photography by Jack Vartoogian
Graphic design by Reid Morris
Production assistant and assistant producer  – Jean-Pierre Leduc
Executive producer – Jim West

References

2001 albums
Dave Van Ronk albums